Frédéric-Antonin Breysse (20 November 1907 – 13 September 2001) was a French cartoonist and illustrator. He was the creator of the comic series The Adventures of Oscar Hamil, published in the weekly Message to the Hearts Valiant and Valiant Hearts between 1945 and 1955.

Publications
 1947: The Most Beautiful Story, text of Father Gaston Courtois, from collection Beautiful Stories and Beautiful Lives, ed. Fleurus
 1952: St Francis of Assisi, the text of Father Jean Pihan from collection Beautiful Stories and Beautiful Lives, ed. Fleurus

The Adventures of Oscar Hamel and Isidore
 1945: Strange Adventure, reissued in 1996 as Volume 9 of the series
 1947: The Conquerors of Infinity, reissued in 1982 as Volume 7 of the series
 1952: The Mystery of Ker-Polik, Oscar Hamel and Isidore T.1
 1952: Uncle Chad, Oscar Hamel and Isidore T.2
 1952 S.O.S. 23-75, Oscar Hamel and Isidore T.3
 1953: The Mountain of Fear, Oscar Hamel and Isidore T.4
 1954: The river of fire, Oscar Hamel and Isidore T.5
 1954: The Forgotten City, Oscar Hamel and Isidore T.6
 1995: The Idol Emerald Eyes, Oscar Hamel and Isidore T.8 ed. du Triomphe
 The mystery of Vultur Totem, an unfinished adventure appearing in Valiant Hearts. Most of these stories have also appeared in this weekly before forthcoming albums.

References
1979: Hop! No. 19, Dossier F.A.Breysse and interview, by Gérard Thomassian

1907 births
2001 deaths
French cartoonists